Zgornji Lehen na Pohorju is a dispersed settlement in the Municipality of Ribnica na Pohorju in northeastern Slovenia. It comprises a number of relatively isolated farmsteads in the Pohorje Hills. The area is part of the traditional Styria region, and it is now included in the Carinthia Statistical Region.

History
Zgornji Lehen na Pohorju was established as a separate settlement in 1994, when it was split off from Lehen na Pohorju in the neighboring Municipality of Podvelka.

References

External links
Zgornji Lehen na Pohorju on Geopedia

Populated places in the Municipality of Ribnica na Pohorju